The Mid Sussex Football League is an association football league formed in 1900. The league is headed by the Premier Division which is at level eleven of the English football league system and member clubs are based in East Sussex, West Sussex and south-eastern Surrey. Current sponsors are Gray Hooper Holt LLP and the league is currently known as the Gray Hooper Holt LLP Mid Sussex League.

History
The league was founded in 1900, made up of seven founder clubs: Ardingly, Burgess Hill, Crawley, Cuckfield, Haywards Heath, Hurstpierpoint and Three Bridges. League rules stipulated clubs had to be from within a twelve-mile radius of Haywards Heath, where the league was founded. In 1903 a second division was formed and the league was accepting membership from clubs based on the south coast. A third division was formed in 1921 and divisions four and five formed in the 1950s.

The Premier Division was formed in 1974 to replace Division One as the top division and another four divisions were added throughout the 1980s and 1990s. In 2002 the league took over management of the Mid Sussex Football Association Senior and Junior Charity Cups following the disbandment of the Mid Sussex Football Association. The Championship Division was formed in 2010.

Current clubs

Premier Division
Ashurst Wood
Balcombe
Battle Town
Cuckfield Rangers
Eastbourne Rangers
Holland Sports
Hollington United
Lindfield
Reigate Priory
Ringmer AFC
Rotherfield
Sedlescombe Rangers
Westfield
Willingdon Athletic

Championship
AFC Uckfield Town II
Buxted
Crawley Devils
Ditchling
Hurstpierpoint
Ifield Sports
Oxted & District
Peacehaven & Telscombe II
Ridgewood 
Roffey Dev
Sovereign Saints
West Hoathly

Division One
AFC Varndeanians II
Balcombe II
Copthorne II
Cuckfield Rangers II
Cuckfield Town
DCK
Lindfield II
Polegate Town
Ringmer AFC II
Royal Earlswood (Godstone)

Division Two North
AFC Acorns
Ansty
Ardingly
Ashurst Wood II
Copthorne A
Crawley United
Forest Row II
Nutfield
Reigate Priory II
Southgate United

Division Two South
Barcombe
Burgess Hill Rhinos
Eastbourne Rangers II
Fletching
Lectern Lights
Newick
Nutley
Portslade Athletic 
Southwick
Willingdon Athletic II

Division Three North
Caterham
Cuckfield Town II
Furnace Green United
Horley AFC
Ifield Albion
Jarvis Brook II
Old Oxted Town
Oxted & District II
Rotherfield II

Division Three South
Brighton & Sussex Medical School
FC Sporting
Horsted Keynes
Lancing United
Peacehaven & Telscombe III
Polegate Town II
Preston Park
Ridgewood II
Ringmer AFC III
Uckfield United
Wivelsfield Green

Division Four North
Balcombe III
Brockham II
Crowborough Athletic MSFL II
East Grinstead Meads
Felbridge
Holland Sports II
Horsham Crusaders III
Ifield
Lindfield III
Wakehams Green
West Hoathly II

Division Four South
AFC Hurst
AFC Varndeanians III
Buxted II
Cuckfield Rangers Dev
Ditchling Dev
Eastbourne Athletic
Keymer & Hassocks
Scaynes Hill
The View
Welcroft Park Rangers

Division Five North
Ardingly II
Ashurst Wood III
Athletico Redhill
Athletico Shrublands
Charlwood Village
East Grinstead Town III
FC Railway
Hartfield
Oxted & District A
Reigate Priory A
Southgate United II

Division Five South
Athletico Burgess Hill
DCK II
Fairfield
Hurstpierpoint II
Lectern Lights II
Maresfield Village
Plumpton Athletic
Portslade Athletic II
Ringmer AFC IV

Division Six North
Crawley & Maidenbower Panthers
Crawley Phoenix
Crawley United II
Gatwick United
Horley AFC II
Horsham Crusaders IV
Ifield Albion II
Pound Hill Thunder
Reigate Priory B
Royal Earlswood II

Division Six South
Barcombe II
Fairfield II
Horsted Keynes II
Hurstpierpoint III
Newick II
Pound Hill Thunder II
Scaynes Hill III
Willingdon Athletic III

Recent Champions

Championship Division formed ahead of the 2010–11 season.

Lower divisions regionalised.

Division Five regionalised into North East, North West and South Divisions.

Recent Cup winners

References

External links
 FA Full-time
 Football League Site

 
Football leagues in England